The Mauritius night heron (Nycticorax mauritianus) is an extinct night heron species from Mauritius. It is only known by seven subfossil bone remains consisted of cranium, pelvis, coracoid, ulna, radius, and tarsometatarsus found in Mare aux Songes. Only the coracoid and the tarsometatarsus are left today. It was scientifically described in 1893 by Edward Newton and Hans Gadow from the Cambridge University. Newton and Gadow measured the tarsometatarsus with 81 to 87 mm. It became presumedly extinct in the late 17th century and was probably first mentioned by François Leguat in 1693 who described them as a "great flight of bitterns".

References

Extinct birds of Indian Ocean islands
Nycticorax
Bird extinctions since 1500
Birds of Mauritius
Extinct animals of Africa
Extinct animals of Mauritius
Birds described in 1893
Taxa named by Hans Friedrich Gadow